X – No Absolutes is the eleventh studio album by American heavy metal band Prong. It was released on February 5, 2016 through Steamhammer/SPV record label. The record was produced by the band's guitarist/vocalist Tommy Victor and engineer Chris Collier.

Victor has described the songs from X – No Absolutes as "a collection of riff intensified crushers, furious barn burners, and fist pumping sing-a-longs." The album features elements from thrash metal, groove metal and industrial rock.

Critical reception

X – No Absolutes has received generally positive reviews. At Metacritic, which assigns a normalized rating out of 100 to reviews from mainstream critics, the album has an average score of 74 based on 4 reviews, indicating "generally favorable reviews". Writing for Classic Rock, Malcolm Dome described the record as "the sound of Prong feeling comfortable in 2016" and "still underground and recognisable as the band who snapped our fingers and necks, but also adding essential modern detail." Chris Ayers of Exclaim! stated: "Though it's impossible to rewind to the MTV-fuelled frenzy around 1994's Cleansing, this album shows that Victor, who turns 50 this year, still schools bands half his age with focus and mettle." Loudwire's Chad Bowar noted the record to be a "very efficient 45 minute album, with very little filler." Revolver wrote that the record was "charged with brawn and brains—thrashy dynamics, chunky grooves, ferocious metal energy, and Tommy Victor’s sharp-tongued socio-political observations."

Track listing 
 "Ultimate Authority" — 2:55
 "Sense of Ease" — 4:05
 "Without Words" — 3:19
 "Cut and Dry" — 3:52
 "No Absolutes" — 3:19
 "Do Nothing" — 3:41
 "Belief System" — 3:22
 "Soul Sickness" — 3:06
 "In Spite of Hindrances" — 2:46
 "Ice Runs Through My Veins" — 4:06
 "Worth Pursuing" — 3:13
 "With Dignity" — 3:16
 "Universal Law" (bonus track) — 3:25

Personnel
Album personnel as adapted from liner notes.

Prong
 Tommy Victor — guitars, vocals
 Jason Christopher — bass
 Art Cruz — drums

Additional personnel
 Tommy Victor — production
 Chris Collier — production, engineer, mixing, mastering
 Sebastian Rohde — artwork
 Firma Freimauer — artwork
 Neil Zlozower — photography
 Secret Playground — photography

Chart positions

References

External links
 

2016 albums
Prong (band) albums
Steamhammer Records albums
SPV GmbH albums
Albums produced by Tommy Victor